The 1984 Atlantic Conference baseball tournament was held from May 5 through 13 to determine the champion of the NCAA Division I the Atlantic 10 Conference, for the 1984 NCAA Division I baseball season.  This was the sixth iteration of the event, and was held at Erny Field, home field of Temple in Philadelphia, Pennsylvania.  Defending champion  won their second championship and earned the conference's automatic bid to the 1984 NCAA Division I baseball tournament.

Format and seeding
The top two teams in each division advanced to the tournament, with each division winner playing the second place team from the opposite division in the first round.  The teams played a double-elimination tournament.  West Virginia claimed the top seed over Penn State and Rhode Island claimed the second seed in the East over Saint Joseph's by tiebreaker.

Results

References

Tournament
Atlantic 10 Conference Baseball Tournament
Atlantic 10 Conference baseball tournament
Atlantic 10 Conference baseball tournament
1980s in Philadelphia
College sports tournaments in Pennsylvania
Baseball competitions in Philadelphia